Fogelstad is a manor house and former seat farm in Södermanland, Sweden. The seat farm was acquired by August Tamm in the late 19th century, where he built what is today Fogelstad manor house. Fogelstad has since been associated with Tamm's daughter, women's rights activist Elisabeth Tamm who was born at Fogelstad, and was one of the first women in parliament.

See also 
 Kvinnliga medborgarskolan vid Fogelstad

References

Bibliography

Further reading 

 Fogelstad, Katrineholms kommun: Trädgårdsmästeriet
 Historiskt-geografiskt och statistiskt lexikon öfver Sverige (1859-1870): Fogelsta

Manor houses in Sweden